The Women's rhythmic group all-around competition at the 2020 Summer Olympics were held at the Ariake Gymnastics Centre in Tokyo, Japan, with the qualification taking place at 7 August and the final on 8 August.

Russian rhythmic gymnasts were the five-time defending champions in the event.

Competition format
The competition consisted of a qualification round and a final round. The top eight teams in the qualification round advance to the final round. In each round, the teams perform two routines (one with 5 balls, one with 3 hoops and 2 pairs of clubs), with the scores added to give a total.

Results

Qualification

Source:

Final

References

rhythmic group all-around
2020
2021 in women's gymnastics
Women's events at the 2020 Summer Olympics